Paradise Murdered (lit. "Homicide Case on Paradise") is a 2007 South Korean film starring Park Hae-il and Park Sol-mi, and is the directorial debut of filmmaker Kim Han-min.

Plot
Off the southern coast of the Korean Peninsula, an island of 17 inhabitants exists. The so-called Paradise Island holds up to its name with its breath-taking mountains and sea coupled with good-natured people. No worries or stress holds for anyone who comes to visit this beautiful oasis. But this peace doesn't last long as every single one of the inhabitants disappear one day without a single trace. Chaos initially breaks out when a blood-drenched corpse is found and everyone becomes a suspect. The furious sea allows them no boat ride to the mainland and their only existing radio communication device has been smashed. Trapped together on the island, everyone is suspicious of each other and even the unseen could be a possible suspect. As hideous secrets get revealed day by day, an island of paradise slowly turns into an island of death.

References

External links
 
 
 
 Joshua Pettigrew, "New Trailer for Korean Thriller Paradise Murdered". Kung Fu Cult Cinema. 20 March 2007. Retrieved 29 March 2007.
 Kim Tae-jong, "Actor Plays Murder Suspect Again". The Korea Times. 13 March 2007. Retrieved 29 March 2007.

2007 films
2000s Korean-language films
South Korean mystery films
2007 directorial debut films
2000s South Korean films
Myung Films films